Stuiver Valley is a high hanging valley, largely ice free, between Mount Circe and Mount Dido on the west and Mount Boreas on the east, in the Olympus Range, Victoria Land. Named by Advisory Committee on Antarctic Names (US-ACAN) in 1997 after Minze Stuiver, geochemist, Quaternary Research Center, University of Washington, Quaternary specialist in dating Antarctic samples with United States Antarctic Research Program (USARP) from 1969 to the time of naming; authority on the glacial history of the McMurdo Sound region and McMurdo Dry Valleys, the location of this valley (not completed).

Valleys of Victoria Land
McMurdo Dry Valleys